Aruvälja is a village in Audru Parish, Pärnu County, in southwestern Estonia. It has a population of 50 (as of 1 January 2011).

Most of the village territory are occupied by bogs, which are part of the Nätsi-Võlla Nature Reserve. The settlement is located in the northeastern part of the territory, by the Pärnu–Lihula road (nr. 60).

References

Villages in Pärnu County